Tsamai (also known as Ts'amay, S'amai, Tamaha, Tsamako, Tsamakko, Bago S'amakk-Ulo) is an Afroasiatic language spoken in Ethiopia. Tsamai is a member of the Dullay dialect continuum. Cule (Kuile, Kule) and evidently Dume (pseudo-pygmies) were apparently varieties.

References

Further reading 
 Graziano Savà.  2005.  A Grammar of Ts'amakko.  Cushitic Language Studies Volume 22.  Cologne:  Rüdiger Köppe Verlag.

Languages of Ethiopia
East Cushitic languages